The discography of As Friends Rust, an American melodic hardcore band, includes one studio album, three compilation albums, four extended plays, two singles and one live video album. The original line-up recorded a demo in November 1996, but failing to secure a record deal, the band parted ways in February 1997. After reforming later that same year, but with a new line-up, the band recorded one new song and combined it with some of the demo's songs to create its debut EP, The Fists of Time, for Belgium's Good Life Recordings in July 1998. In December 1998, As Friends Rust released a split with Discount, also on Good Life.

The band signed with American record label Doghouse Records and released the eponymous EP, As Friends Rust, in September 1999 (co-released by Good Life in Europe). This was followed by a series of reissues of its early material, starting with Eleven Songs on Japan's Howling Bull Entertainment in October 1999, The Fists of Time: An Anthology of Short Fiction and Non-Fiction on Doghouse in June 2000, and Eleven Songs on England's Golf Records in October 2001. 

In March 2001, Doghouse issued the single Morningleaver / This Is Me Hating You as part of the Doghouse Fan Series. In October 2001, As Friends Rust's debut full-length album, Won, was released by Doghouse / Defiance / Howling Bull. The band next signed with American record label Equal Vision Records and released the EP A Young Trophy Band in the Parlance of Our Times in May 2002. A concert during the Won tour with Strike Anywhere was filmed and released in December 2002 as Camden Underworld, London – 16 November 2001 by Punkervision. After considerable line-up changes, the band changed name to Salem in September 2002.

As Friends Rust reunited in 2008. In 2014 and 2015, the band issued the compilation albums Greatest Hits? (on Cosmic Note, D'Kolektif and Shield Recordings), and The Porch Days: 1998 to 2000 (on Demons Run Amok Entertainment). In 2020, As Friends Rust recorded and released its first new material in eighteen years with the EP Up From the Muck on Unity Worldwide Records.

Albums

Studio albums

Compilation albums

Extended plays

Singles

Videos

Video albums

Demos

Other appearances

References

External links 
 
 
 
 

Discography
Discographies of American artists
Post-hardcore group discographies
Punk rock group discographies